Koen Bijen (born 27 July 1998) is a Dutch field hockey player who plays as a forward for Hoofdklasse club Den Bosch and the Dutch national team.

Club career
Bijen first played football when he was young but after nine years of playing football he switched to hockey and joined HDM. When HDM in 2017 was promoted to the Hoofdklasse, he was deemed not good enough  and he left HDM for Klein Zwitserland. He currently plays for Den Bosch who he joined in 2020.

International career

Under–21
In 2019 Bijen made his debut for the national junior team during an eight-nations tournament in Madrid. He went on to represent the team at the EuroHockey Junior Championship in Valencia later that year, winning a bronze medal.

Oranje
Koen Bijen made his senior debut for the Oranje in 2021 during season three of the FIH Pro League.

He was officially named in the national senior squad in 2022.

References

External links
 
 

1998 births
Living people
Dutch male field hockey players
Male field hockey forwards
HC Den Bosch players
Men's Hoofdklasse Hockey players
HC Klein Zwitserland players
Haagsche Delftsche Mixed players
Sportspeople from Leiden
2023 Men's FIH Hockey World Cup players
21st-century Dutch people